The Tahquamenon River is an  blackwater river in the U.S. state of Michigan that flows in a generally eastward direction through the eastern end of the Upper Peninsula. It begins in the Tahquamenon Lakes in northeast Columbus Township of Luce County and empties into Lake Superior near the village of Paradise. M-123 runs alongside a portion of the river.

Name
The meaning of "Tahquamenon" is not known. Some called it the "River of the Head Winds" because they bucked the wind on the lower river no matter what direction they were paddling. Others called it the "River of a Hundred Bends". Twentieth century descendants of local Chippewa translated the name to mean "river up against a hill" or "lost river island" or "river with an island part way". In 1930 Jesuit scholar, Father William Gagnieut, concluded that the meaning of the name had been lost.

Recorded variously as 'Otikwaminang,' 'Outakwamenon,' 'Tequamenen', 'Tanguamanon,' 'Tanquamanon,' 'Toumequellen' and 'Tahquamenaw', several suggestions on the meaning of its name have been made over the years:
The early French travelers called the Great Lakes region natives "Outaouaks".
 "Shortcut." The name referring originally to Tahquamenon Bay, which the Ojibwe used as a shortcut while traveling. The bay has a small island in it that facilitated the "shortcut" from Whitefish Point across the open and at times dangerous bay.  The name "shortcut" was later given to the River that enters into the bay. However, although 'taqua' (dakwaa) does mean "short", the suffix for "road" or "trail" is -mon in Ojibwe, not 'menon', and although -ing would be a locative suffix, the locative form of -mon is -moong and not -moning. However, in the Algonquin language, the locative form of -mon would be -monaang, closely resembling 'menon'. Additionally, in the Potawatomi language, suffix for "road" or "trail" is -mii, and like in the Algonquin language, the locative form of -mii would be -miinaang, most closely resembling 'menon'.
 "Marsh of the blueberries," though 'menon' (miinan) does mean "blueberries" in the Ojibwa language, 'tahqua' does not mean "marsh"
 "Short cornel" where 'tahqua' (dakwaa) does mean "short" and 'manan' (maanan) does mean "cornel", but cornels do not grow in swamplands
 "Ottawa's good land" (Odaawaag minaang) due to an Ottawa village that used to be located near the mouth of the river
 "Dark-colored water". Although the river's water is dark, the word for "dark-colored water" in Ojibwe is makadewaagamin.
The name for the Tahquamenon River in the Ojibwa language is Adikamegong-ziibi "River where the Whitefish are found." This name is also the naming basis for the Whitefish Point and Whitefish Bay, both known earlier as "Tahquamenaw".

Tahquamenon Falls
Because the headwaters of the river are located in a boreal wetland that is rich in cedar, spruce and hemlock trees, the river's waters carry a significant amount of tannin in solution (i.e., it is a blackwater river), and are often brown or golden-brown in color. The Tahquamenon Falls are thus acclaimed as being the largest naturally dyed or colored waterfall in the United States.

Recreation
In Henry Wadsworth Longfellow's famous poem, The Song of Hiawatha (1855), the hero learned how to paddle a birchbark canoe in the Tahquamenon.  The river is often used for canoeing to this day.  The river's watershed and state park are also extensively used for fishing and hiking. In winter, the watershed welcomes snowmobilers.

Tour boat
The Toonerville Trolley Train and Riverboat Tour, a private firm, offers  boat tours of the upper Tahquamenon as part of an overall family experience that includes a narrow-gauge rail ride and visit to the Upper Tahquamenon Falls. The tour is based in Soo Junction, between Newberry and Hulbert.

References

Taylor, Sprague, (1991, 2008). Tahquamenon Country: A look at the past. Historical Society of Michigan, East Lansing, Michigan. .

External links

Tahquamenon Falls State Park
Toonerville Trolley Riverboat Tour
Tahquamenon River Streamflow Data from the USGS

Rivers of Michigan
Wild and Scenic Rivers of the United States
Rivers of Chippewa County, Michigan
Rivers of Luce County, Michigan
Tributaries of Lake Superior